The WWE SmackDown Women's Championship is a women's professional wrestling world championship created and promoted by the American promotion WWE, defended on the SmackDown brand division. It is one of two women's world titles for WWE's main roster, along with the WWE Raw Women's Championship on Raw. The current champion is Charlotte Flair, who is in her record seventh reign.

The title was unveiled on the August 23, 2016, episode of SmackDown Live as the counterpart title to the then-WWE Women's Championship, which became exclusive to Raw as a result of the 2016 WWE draft. That title was subsequently renamed after the crowning of the inaugural SmackDown Women's Champion Becky Lynch. The SmackDown Women's Championship has been contested in the main event of three WWE pay-per-view events: TLC: Tables, Ladders & Chairs in 2018 and, along with the Raw Women's Championship, WWE's flagship event WrestleMania in 2019, and by itself on Night 1 of WrestleMania in 2021. It was also the first women's professional wrestling championship to be defended in Saudi Arabia, which occurred at Super ShowDown in 2020, and again at Crown Jewel in 2021.

History 

In July 2016, WWE reintroduced the brand extension wherein the promotion again divided its roster between the Raw and SmackDown brands where wrestlers are exclusively assigned to perform; the first brand split ended in August 2011. During the 2016 draft, reigning WWE Women's Champion Charlotte was drafted to Raw, leaving SmackDown without a women's championship. Immediately following SummerSlam on the August 23, 2016, episode of SmackDown, SmackDown commissioner Shane McMahon and general manager Daniel Bryan unveiled the SmackDown Women's Championship (Raw's title was subsequently renamed). A six-pack elimination challenge was then scheduled for Backlash on September 11, 2016, to determine the inaugural champion. The six women who competed at SummerSlam in the six-woman tag team match were chosen for the six-pack challenge: Alexa Bliss, Becky Lynch, Carmella, Naomi, Natalya, and Nikki Bella. Lynch became the inaugural champion when she last eliminated Carmella. The NXT Women's Championship would become WWE's third main women's title when the NXT brand, formerly the promotion's developmental territory, became WWE's third major brand in September 2019 when it was moved to the USA Network.

The championship belt design is physically identical to the Raw Women's Championship with the only difference being that the background of the center plate and the default side plates' globes are blue (as opposed to red) to symbolize its exclusivity to SmackDown. In what has become a prominent feature of the majority of WWE's championship belts, the side plates can be customized with the champion's logo. During Naomi's second reign, strips of multi interchanging colored LED lights were placed around the outline of the WWE logo and the outline of the belt to go with her "glow" gimmick.

The title headlined a pay-per-view event for the first time at TLC: Tables, Ladders & Chairs in December 2018, where Becky Lynch defended it in a triple threat Tables, Ladders, and Chairs match against Charlotte Flair and Asuka, which Asuka won; this was also the first women's TLC triple threat match. The title was then on the line in a winner takes all triple threat match in the main event of WrestleMania 35 in April 2019, where Flair defended the title against Raw Women's Champion Ronda Rousey and Lynch, who won the match. This was the first women's match to main event a WrestleMania – WWE's flagship event. At Super ShowDown in February 2020, the title became the first women's championship to be defended in Saudi Arabia, where Bayley retained the title over Naomi; this was only the second women's match contested in the country. The title would again be on the line in the main event of a WrestleMania, this time Night 1 of WrestleMania 37 in April 2021 where Bianca Belair defeated Sasha Banks to win the title; this was also the first time that two African-Americans headlined a WrestleMania and only the second women's match to main event the annual show. The title was defended for a second time in Saudi Arabia at Crown Jewel in 2021, where Becky Lynch retained against Bianca Belair and Sasha Banks in a triple threat match.

Inaugural championship match

Brand designation history 
As its name implies, the championship was established for the SmackDown brand. However, the title is still eligible to switch brands during the annual WWE Draft.

Reigns 

Becky Lynch was the inaugural champion. Charlotte Flair has the most reigns at seven. Bayley's second reign is the longest singular reign at 380 days, while Flair's fourth reign is the shortest at 4 minutes and 55 seconds. Bayley also holds the record for longest combined reign at 520 days. Asuka is the oldest champion, having won the title at 37, while Alexa Bliss is the youngest when she won it at 25.

Charlotte Flair is the current champion in her record seventh reign. She won the title by defeating Ronda Rousey on the December 30, 2022, episode of SmackDown in Tampa, Florida.

References

External links 

 Official SmackDown Women's Title History

WWE SmackDown
WWE women's championships